Andrew Hore (born 18 June 1969) is a New Zealand former cricketer. He played 26 first-class and 45 List A matches for Otago between 1996 and 2005. In February 2020, he was named in New Zealand's squad for the Over-50s Cricket World Cup in South Africa. However, the tournament was cancelled during the third round of matches due to the COVID-19 pandemic.

See also
 List of Otago representative cricketers

References

External links
 

1969 births
Living people
New Zealand cricketers
Otago cricketers
Cricketers from Oamaru